was a Japanese samurai who was the third head of the Hitotsubashi branch of the Tokugawa family. His childhood name was Konosuke (好之助).

Family
 Father: Tokugawa Harusada (1751-1827)
 Mother: Otomi no Kata (d.1817)
 Wife: Ichijo Yasuko
 Concubines:
 Nojiri-dono
 Higuchi-dono
 Children:
 Katsuchiyo
 Tokugawa Narinori (1803-1830) by Nojiri
 Nobunosuke
 Rikihime married Arima Yorinori
 Tsunehime (1805-1858) married Shimazu Nariakira
 Kikuhime married Okudaira Nobumasa by Higuchi

Reference

1780 births
1816 deaths
Samurai
Tokugawa clan